is an EP released by The GazettE on June 25, 2003. The first pressings of this CD were limited to 5000 copies. A limited edition came in a digipack form. Also, the lyrics insert 
that came with the limited edition contains pictures not included in the regular edition.

The songs from this release are featured on the compilation album Dainihon Itangeishateki Noumiso Gyaku Kaiten Zekkyou Ongenshuu, along with the tracks from Spermargarita and Cockayne Soup.

Track listing

Notes
"Wife" is a re-recording of the same song featured on the Gozen 0-ji no Trauma Radio single, released in 2002.
Akuyuukai was reissued in 2005.

References

The Gazette (band) albums
2003 EPs

ja:悪友會〜あくゆうかい〜